Whiffling is a term used in ornithology to describe the behavior whereby a bird rapidly descends with a zig-zagging, side-slipping motion.  Sometimes to whiffle, a bird flies briefly with its body turned upside down but with its neck and head twisted 180 degrees around in a normal position.  The aerodynamics which usually give a bird lift during flying are thereby inverted and the bird briefly plummets toward the ground before this is quickly reversed and the bird adopts a normal flying orientation.  This erratic motion resembles a falling leaf, and is used to avoid avian predators or may be used by geese (family Anatidae) to avoid a long, slow descent over an area where wildfowling is practised.

The behavior is seen in several species including lesser yellowlegs (Tringa flavipes), the black-tailed godwit (Limosa limosa), the northern lapwing (Vanellus vanellus), geese (e.g. pink-footed goose (Anser brachyrhynchus)), three species of scoter (Melanitta), and other members of the family Anatidae.

References

External links
 Goose flies upside-down
 Whiffling geese: photographs and comments on reasons
 Slow-motion video of whiffling geese

Aerodynamics
Bird flight
Ethology
Geese
Ornithology